Alberto Méndez Rodríguez (born 24 October 1974) is a German former professional footballer who played as a midfielder.

Career
Born in Nuremberg, West Germany of Spanish descent, Méndez was discovered by Arsenal and Arsène Wenger playing for German non-league side 1. SC Feucht, and signed for the English in the 1997 summer. He made his debut with the main squad in a League Cup match against Birmingham City on 14 October as a substitute, and scored the final goal in a 4–1 home win.

However, Méndez could not establish himself in the Gunners' first team, and played in only eleven official matches – four of which were in the league – in five seasons, with one goal to his name. He had subsequent spells with AEK Athens, SpVgg Unterhaching (his only Bundesliga experience, which consisted in six appearances from the bench during the 1999–2000 campaign), Racing de Ferrol and Terrassa FC, the latter two in Spain's second division, before returning to Germany permanently in 2004, playing in the lower leagues well into his 30s.

Méndez joined Bavarian amateur club FC Amberg as a coach in 2011, but was dismissed in April 2013 despite considerable success overall.

References

External links

1974 births
Living people
German people of Spanish descent
Footballers from Nuremberg
German footballers
Spanish footballers
Association football midfielders
Premier League players
Bundesliga players
3. Liga players
Segunda División players
Arsenal F.C. players
Super League Greece players
AEK Athens F.C. players
Racing de Ferrol footballers
Terrassa FC footballers
SpVgg Unterhaching players
SV Darmstadt 98 players
SV Sandhausen players
German football managers
FC Amberg managers
German expatriate footballers
German expatriate sportspeople in England
Expatriate footballers in England
German expatriate sportspeople in Greece
Expatriate footballers in Greece